József Kanta (born 24 March 1984) is a Hungarian professional football coach and a former player. He is the coach of the Under-19 squad of MTK Budapest. He represented the Hungary national football team. He won the first of his two caps against Cyprus on 6 February 2007.

In 2006, he got the Ferenc Puskás prize and, in 2008, he got the József Bozsik prize from the Hungarian Football Federation.

Honours
MTK Hungária FC
Hungarian League: 2008
Runner-up: 2007
Ferenc Puskás prize: 2006
József Bozsik prize: 2008

Club statistics

Updated to games played as of 15 May 2021.

References

External links
 
 Profile at HLSZ 

1984 births
Living people
Sportspeople from Keszthely
Hungarian footballers
Association football midfielders
Hungary international footballers
MTK Budapest FC players
BFC Siófok players
Nemzeti Bajnokság I players
Hungarian football managers